The Welterweight competition was the fifth-highest weight class featured  at the 2009 World Amateur Boxing Championships, and was held at the Mediolanum Forum. Welterweights were limited to a maximum of 69 kilograms in body mass.

Medalists

Seeds

  Carlos Banteux  (third round)
  Serik Sapiyev (semifinals)
  Magomed Nurutdinov (second round)
  Oscar Molina  (third round)
  Jaoid Chiguer  (second round)
  Jack Culcay-Keth  (champion)
  Botirjon Mahmudov  (semifinals)
  Omar Mamedshayev (first round)

Draw

Finals

Top Half

Section 1

Section 2

Bottom Half

Section 3

Section 4

See also
Boxing at the 2008 Summer Olympics – Welterweight

External links
Draw

Welterweight